George Allen & Unwin was a British publishing company formed in 1911 when Sir Stanley Unwin purchased a controlling interest in George Allen & Co. It went on to become one of the leading publishers of the twentieth century and to establish an Australian subsidiary in 1976. In 1990, Allen & Unwin was sold to HarperCollins and the Australian branch was the subject of a management buy-out.

George Allen & Unwin in the UK
George Allen & Sons was established in 1871 by George Allen, with the backing of John Ruskin, becoming George Allen & Co. Ltd. in 1911 and then George Allen & Unwin in 1914 as a result of Stanley Unwin's  purchase of a controlling interest. Unwin's son Rayner S. Unwin and nephew Philip helped run the company, which published the works of Bertrand Russell, Arthur Waley, Roald Dahl, Lancelot Hogben, and Thor Heyerdahl. It became well known as J. R. R. Tolkien's publisher, some time after publishing the popular children's fantasy novel The Hobbit in 1937, and its high fantasy sequel The Lord of the Rings novel in 1954–1955. Book series published by the firm in this period included the Muirhead Library of Philosophy and Unwin Books.

Rayner Unwin retired at the end of 1985, and the firm was amalgamated in 1986 with Bell & Hyman to form Unwin Hyman Ltd.. Robin Hyman became chief executive of the combined Unwin Hyman. From this time Allen & Unwin was an Australia-based, child company of Unwin Hyman. Rayner Unwin returned for a while as part-time chairman of Unwin Hyman, retiring again at the end of 1988. It was over the objections of largest shareholder Unwin that in 1990 Hyman sold the firm to HarperCollins. HarperCollins has since sold Unwin Hyman's academic book list to Routledge.

Allen & Unwin in Australia
Allen & Unwin Australia Pty Ltd became independent in July 1990 by means of a management buy-out when the UK firm was bought by HarperCollins. Now known simply as "Allen & Unwin" the company went on to become the most successful "independent" in Australia and currently publishes up to 250 new titles a year.

Allen & Unwin publishes across a broad range of areas including literary and commercial fiction, popular and serious non-fiction — including biography, memoir, history, true crime, politics, current affairs, and travel — academic and professional, children's books and books for teenagers. Among the many authors published by Allen & Unwin are Alex Miller, Christos Tsiolkas, Garth Nix, Jodi Picoult, Kate Morton, Michael Connelly, Thomas Keneally, Peter Corris, Paul Keating, Stephanie Dowrick, and Christopher Hitchens. Allen & Unwin is also co-sponsor and publisher of the annual Australian/Vogel Literary Award.

The Allen & Unwin head office is in Sydney and the company also publishes out of offices in Melbourne, Auckland, and London. Allen & Unwin also represents a number of leading independent British publishers in the Australian and New Zealand markets. These include Bloomsbury, Faber & Faber, Profile Books and Serpent's Tail, Atlantic and Corvus, Granta and Portobello, Canongate, Nicholas Brealey, Icon, and Nosy Crow. Allen & Unwin distributes the Harry Potter series of books in Australia and New Zealand under the Bloomsbury imprint.

Since the inaugural award in 1992, Allen & Unwin has been voted Publisher of the Year fourteen times including in 2020. The founder and chairman of Allen & Unwin is Patrick Gallagher, the CEO is Robert Gorman and the publishing director is Tom Gilliatt. In 2020, Allen & Unwin sold its textbooks and professional lists to Taylor & Francis.

The Australian/Vogel Literary Award
In 1979, Niels Stevns (of Stevns and Company Pty Ltd, which makes Vogel bread) created The Australian/Vogel Literary Award in collaboration with The Australian newspaper and Allen & Unwin. The award is for an unpublished manuscript by a writer under the age of 35. The award includes that the winning manuscript will be published by Allen & Unwin.

Legal case
In 2012, legal actions were initiated against Allen & Unwin regarding a book authored by Fairfax Media journalist Eamonn Duff. In the first case, the judge awarded $50,000 damages for breach of copyright in the unauthorised use of family photographs. Defamation cases followed, and in August 2014, two family members were awarded $325,000 in damages.

References and sources
References

Sources

Further reading
 Frank Arthur Mumby and Frances Helena Swan Stallybrass, From Swan Sonnenschein to George Allen & Unwin Ltd. London: Allen & Unwin, 1955. With an introduction by Dr. John Murray.
Philip Unwin, The Publishing Unwins (London: William Heinemann Ltd., 1972)
Rayner Unwin, George Allen and Unwin: A Remembrancer (Ludlow: Merlin Unwin, 1999)
Stanley Unwin, The Truth About a Publisher (London: George Allen & Unwin, 1960)

External links

 
 Records of George Allen & Unwin Ltd at Archives Hub

 
Book publishing companies of Australia
Book publishing companies of the United Kingdom

News Corporation subsidiaries